Ferrol Diario was a Galician newspaper founded in Ferrol, Spain, sometime in the late 1950s and very early 1960s. It did not survive the turbulent and difficult years of the early 1980s, which were marked with a huge recession in the shipbuilding sector affecting Ferrol considerably.

See also 
El Diario de Ferrol 
El Correo Gallego

External links
  El Ferrol’s Outer-Port plans of the early 1990s started to be implemented with the dawn of the new century.
  The 1980s  shipbuilding crisis together with other factors made El Ferrol’s economy to fall almost vertically towards the abyss
  Picture of the “Plaza de España” in El Ferrol with the equestrian statue of General Francisco Franco
  Views of El Ferrol del Caudillo during the 1960s (Note: El Ferrol lost its title of “del Caudillo” during the 1980s)

Defunct newspapers published in Spain
Mass media in Ferrol, Spain
Publications with year of establishment missing
Publications with year of disestablishment missing
Spanish-language newspapers